The following highways are numbered 911:

Canada
  Saskatchewan Highway 911

Costa Rica
  National Route 911

India
  National Highway 911 (India)

United States